Qaraqaşlı is a village and municipality in the Neftchala Rayon of Azerbaijan. It has a population of 2,469.  The municipality consists of the villages of Qaraqaşlı, Beştalı, and Şorkənd.

Notable natives 

 Khanoglan Mammadov — National Hero of Azerbaijan.

References

Populated places in Neftchala District